Peddlers is a 2012 Indian Hindi-language crime thriller film written and directed by Vasan Bala. The film stars Gulshan Devaiah, Nishikant Kamat, Kriti Malhotra, Nimrat Kaur and Siddharth Menon. The film was screened as part of International Critics' Week of 2012 Cannes Film Festival. The film will be released on Eros Now in 2021.

Plot
The film is set in Mumbai, and revolves around 20-year-old destitute boys who get trapped in the drug trade and a young cop, who tracks them.

Cast
 Gulshan Devaiah as Ranjit D'souza
 Nishikant Kamat
 Nimrat Kaur as Kuljeet 
 Kriti Malhotra as Bilkis
 Siddharth Mennon as Mandar
 Mukesh Chhabra
 Zachary Coffin
 Murari Kumar as JJ 
 Vijesh Rajan as Meth Cook

Reception
Director Vasan Bala was deemed by several critics to have shown promise in his debut effort at Cannes. Deloret Imnidian of High on Films wrote "Vasan Bala's film breaths a fresh air of Indian New Wave cinema".

References

External links

2012 films
2012 crime thriller films
Indian crime thriller films
2010s Hindi-language films
Films about drugs
Films set in Mumbai
Fictional portrayals of the Maharashtra Police
2012 directorial debut films
Eros Now original films